There are a number of things named after Adam Mickiewicz, a Polish poet, dramatist, essayist, publicist, translator, professor of Slavic literature, and political activist. He is regarded as national poet in Poland, Lithuania and Belarus. A principal figure in Polish Romanticism, he is counted as one of Poland's "Three Bards" ("Trzej Wieszcze") and is widely regarded as Poland's greatest poet. He is also considered one of the greatest Slavic and European poets and has been dubbed a "Slavic bard". A leading Romantic dramatist,[8] he has been compared in Poland and Europe to Byron and Goethe.

Institutions
 Adam Mickiewicz High School in Poznań
 Adam Mickiewicz Institute, Warsaw
 Adam Mickiewicz Library and Dramatic Circle, Buffalo, New York
 Adam Mickiewicz Museum:
 Adam Mickiewicz Museum, Istanbul
 Adam Mickiewicz Museum, Paris
 Adam Mickiewicz Museum of Literature, Warsaw
 Adam Mickiewicz Theatre, Cieszyn
 Adam Mickiewicz University in Poznań
 Adam Mickiewicz University Polar Station

Places
Asteroid 5889 Mickiewicz
Mickiewicz (crater)
Mickiewicz Square, Lviv, Ukraine
Adam Mickiewicz Alley, Bydgoszcz
Osiedle Mickiewicza, Białystok
Wzgórze Mickiewicza, a district of Gdańsk
Most streets in the district are named after the characters of Mickiewicz's book Pan Tadeusz (e.g. Ulica Jacka Soplicy, Ulica Telimeny). Some of them bear the names of the characters of other works (e.g. Ulica Świtezianki, Ulica Rusałki) by Mickiewicz or of people connected with the poets life (e.g. Ulica Maryli, Ulica Filaretów).
, Tatra Mountains

Adam Mickiewicz Monument
Adam Mickiewicz Monument, Gorzów Wielkopolski
Adam Mickiewicz Monument, Kraków
Adam Mickiewicz Monument, Lviv, Ukraine
, France

Adam Mickiewicz Monument, Vilnius
Adam Mickiewicz Monument, Warsaw

Other
 Mickiewicz Battalion, Spanish Civil War
 Mickiewicz's Legion, 1848, Rome
 10 złotych coin commemorating Adam Mickiewicz (:pl:10 złotych wzór 1975 Adam Mickiewicz)
Portrait of Adam Mickiewicz on the Ayu-Dag Cliff, National Museum, Warsaw

Mickiewicz, Adam
Adam Mickiewicz